Unipart Group is a British multinational logistics, supply chain, manufacturing and consultancy company headquartered in Cowley, Oxfordshire, England. It has operations in Europe, North America, Australia and Japan and works across a variety of sectors that include automotive, retail, technology and rail.

Originally part of the state-owned conglomerate British Leyland (BL), Unipart was a distributor of service parts for BL (and later, Austin Rover) vehicles. It was demerged from BL in 1987 in a management buyout and is a partially employee-owned and is one of the largest privately owned companies in the UK. For the year ending 2016, the company had a turnover of £747.7 million.

History

Unipart was formed in 1974 as the parts and service division of British Leyland (BL), under the management of John Egan, who ran it as an independent subsidiary of BL. The use of the Unipart brand to market service parts for British Leyland vehicles was similar in concept to Ford's Motorcraft brand. The following year British Leyland was effectively nationalised, while Egan left in 1976 to join Massey Ferguson.

Egan was replaced by 29-year-old John Neill, who continued Egan's policy of providing the same logistical services to BL's competitors as well as to its parent. In 1987, shortly after British Leyland had been re-privatised as the Rover Group, Neill led a management buyout of Unipart, in part financed by a wider employee buy-in. Unipart is now 70% owned by its workforce and pension fund, the other 30% is held by sympathetic institutions. After the buyout, Unipart's main business stream was in distribution and logistics, including the marketing and distribution of automotive products, but included two manufacturing sites. In 1988, the company secured a contract to produce parts for Honda's factory at Swindon.

In 1997, Unipart backed a management-led buyout team at National Railway Supplies, a servicer and distributor of signalling and telecom equipment for the rail industry and acquired a minority shareholding in the newly privatised company. The company purchased 100 percent of the firm in 2001, along with its York, Brighton and Crewe locations.

Unipart purchased the Partco network, a distributor of parts into the automotive aftermarket in 1999. Partco was renamed Unipart Automotive.

In 2006, the company announced a 10-year deal with Vodafone, to operate it cell phone handset repair business.

In 2009, Unipart was chosen by Sky to operate its set-top box repair business, including logistics, recycling services, and fleet management.

In 2011, 51% of the Unipart Automotive parts business was sold to H2 Equity Partners. The remaining 49% of Unipart Automotive was retained by Unipart Group. A condition of the sale was that Unipart Group exercised no control over the business. Under its new ownership, Unipart Automotive was granted a restricted licence by Unipart Group to use the Unipart brand on a limited range of wholesale outlets and a tightly controlled range of automotive car parts in the UK.

In April 2013, H2 sold Sator Holding to Unipart Automotive's main rival Euro Car parts for £176 million. In July 2014, Unipart Automotive entered into administration with the loss of more than 1,200 jobs. Some branches and 361 staff were moved to Andrew Page and the Parts Alliance.

In 2014, Unipart Group began working with Andrew Page and the UK Parts Alliance to ensure that British used car owners would continue to be supported via Unipart Car Care Centres, which are based in towns across the UK, and delivered the same standard of service to their customers. In December 2014, Unipart announced a joint venture with Lucchini RS Group, the venture was named LUR Limited and produced railway wheel, wheelsets and other activities.

In March 2015, the company announced that it was launching a new high-tech engineering and manufacturing business called Unipart Powertrain Applications.

In May 2015 Unipart announced its biggest rise in profits for 10 years, said to be due to continued productivity improvements. That same year, Unipart launched a joint venture with Rolls-Royce called MetLase Limited. MetLase uses high precision, laser cutting technology, and patented assembly and joining systems, to enable engineers to produce prototypes rapidly.

In 2016, Unipart Rail acquired Park Signalling, a firm specialising in the design and build of signalling, telecoms, control and monitoring equipment on rail networks. In 2017, Unipart Rail acquired Key Fasteners, a supplier of rail industry materials, and a controlling share Instrumentel Ltd., one of the UK's leading technology companies. In 2018, Unipart Logistics and Waterstones agreed to extend their long-term partnership for an additional five years.

In 2018 Unipart Logistics won a 5-year £730 million contract with the NHS meaning DHL warehouses across the country, who originally owned this contract, have now become Unipart sites across the country. Each site is known by the name Unipart NHS Supply Chain.

International expansion
At the 2013 European Supply Chain Excellence Awards, Unipart was awarded Overall Winner for its management of aftermarket support of 1.2 million Jaguar Cars globally. That same year, Unipart also received the Aftermarket Parts logistics trophy at the  Automotive Supply Chain Global Awards. Unipart was one of seven organisations worldwide to be awarded both the Sword of Honour and the Globe of Honour by the British Safety Council in 2013 for the second year in a row for its Oxford distribution centre. That year six Unipart sites received the Sword of Honor award.

In January 2014, Unipart announced the development of two new manufacturing facilities, one at the Coventry site focused on high-tech fuel system components and one at Kautex Unipart Ltd as part of its partnership with German company Kautex Textron.

In 2014, Vince Cable, the Secretary of State for Business, Innovation & Skills and the APC (Advanced Propulsion Centre) launched the ACTIVE (Advanced Combustion Turbocharge Inline Variable Valvetrain Engine) project supported by the Automotive Council at Ford's Dunton Technical Centre focused on the advancement of propulsion development and production. The project included work at eleven partner locations, including Unipart Eberspacher Exhaust Systems. That same year, Unipart worked with University of Huddersfield's Institute of Railway Research to develop The Centre for Innovation in Rail.

In April 2014, Unipart announced a five-year logistics contract with Qoros Automotive based in Changshu, China. That same year, Unipart signed a distribution contract with Toyota in India. The contract covered distribution operations in Kolkata, and was Unipart's second logistics contract with Toyota in India, following a 2012 contract at the Bangalore site.

Corporate affairs
Unipart's traditional promotion of its services was by motorsports sponsorship, from 1978 with the Triumph Dolomite Formula 3 team, and from 1980 in Formula One, first with Ensign and then with McLaren until 1983. Once Unipart was completely independent they returned to Formula One sponsorship, with Tyrrell and later with Jordan Grand Prix.

Unipart has strong links with the local community and education, supporting many community initiatives and organisations. Unipart has a traditionally strong affiliation with motorsport. In 2006, the company teamed up with Nigel Mansell and his sons, Greg and Leo, in a sponsorship deal in support of Nigel's sons' careers in Formula BMW.

The Unipart Way
"The Unipart Way" is a system of lean manufacturing tools and techniques, with a guiding philosophy to reduce waste or activities which do not add value. Based on the company's learning from Honda and study into the Toyota Production System, it is the name the company has given to its methodology. It involves a process of continuous measurement which is designed to lead to a reduction of wasteful activity, thereby ensuring the best deployment of time and resources.

The methodology has been implemented in public institutions, including Sherwood Forest Hospitals NHS Foundation Trust where a partnership with Unipart helped the healthcare provider earn an award as the most improved healthcare employer in the UK.

Unipart U
In 1993, the company founded Unipart U to provide training to shop floor workers and managers. By 1998, Unipart U offered 180 courses for employees and had two main facilities, Learning Curve, a resource centre and Leading Edge, a training centre for new technologies. In 2000, the company invested £1.5 million to create a computerized training courses named 'Virtual U' and available on shop floors for its employees.

In 2014, Unipart announced a £32m joint venture with Coventry University called The Institute for Advanced Manufacturing and Engineering, located at Unipart's manufacturing site in Coventry. The program received £7.9 million in funding from the Higher Education Funding Council and was also backed by George Osborne. Construction began on the Institute in April 2014.

The Institute opened in 2015. As part of the partnership, 60 students at Coventry University divide their time between lecture halls and Unipart's manufacturing site.

Divisions

There are three main operating divisions within the Unipart Group: Unipart Logistics, Unipart Manufacturing and Unipart Consultancy, and within these are various business units.

 Unipart Logistics: This division manages end-to-end supply chains while providing a variety of other services including warehousing, fulfillment and reverse logistics in Europe, Asia Pacific and North America. Through its supply chain consulting arm, the company provides supply chain optimisation.  It won a five-year £730 million contract in September 2018 for transporting medical equipment to NHS trusts in September 2018 after a legal challenge from DHL Supply Chain, the incumbent supplier.
 Unipart International: With operations based in mainland Europe, the Gulf and the US, Unipart International provides services and products to the truck and bus aftermarket, the collision parts industry and the industrial and automotive heat exchange markets.
 Unipart Rail: This division is located in the North of England with sites in Crewe and Doncaster and provides engineering and logistic solutions to the rail supply chain. The company also has several other brands which it has acquired and trades under such as Dorman who specialise in LED Lighting. In 2015, the division was recognised as the best in the industry for collaborative working at the UK Rail Industry Awards.
 Unipart Manufacturing: This division produces original equipment components and is a first-tier supplier to the automotive industry, supplying a customer base which includes British, European and Japanese vehicle manufacturers. It also designs, manufactures and services heat exchangers. In 2016, Unipart Manufacturing announced a 7-year contract supplying engine components for Ford cars being manufactured in China.
 Unipart Expert Practices: This division provides services to external clients in the form of management and supply chain consultancy. UEP has worked with business in the sectors including Health, Government and Finance.

References

External links 
 Unipart Group Official site

Business services companies established in 1974
Companies based in Oxford
Employee-owned companies of the United Kingdom
Former nationalised industries of the United Kingdom
British Leyland
1974 establishments in England